Thomas Cailley (born 29 April 1980) is a French screenwriter and film director. In 2014, he made his feature directorial debut with Love at First Fight, which won three César Awards including Best First Feature Film.

Biography
Born in Clermont-Ferrand, Cailley studied at Sciences Po Bordeaux. After completing general studies, he spent three years working in a company producing television documentaries. In 2007, he entered La Fémis, studying in the screenwriting department.

Filmography

Decorations 
 Chevalier of the Order of Arts and Letters (2015)

References

External links

1980 births
Living people
French film directors
French male screenwriters
Writers from Clermont-Ferrand
French screenwriters
French-language film directors
Chevaliers of the Ordre des Arts et des Lettres